The Small Arms Weapons Effect Simulator (SAWES) was a training device used by the British Army during the 1980s. It consisted of an infrared projector mounted on the L1A1 self-loading rifle and later the SA80, and a harness with receptors to receive the beams to simulate hits. The sight had a similar reticle as the SUSAT and a cable attached to the trigger that activated the device when using blank ammunition. An unusual 'Umpire gun' existed made from L1A1 components was used by range staff.

Users

References

See also
Deployable Tactical Engagement System
Realistic Engagement And Combat Training System
Airsoft
Quasar
Military exercise
Paintball
Opposing force

Military lasers
Laser tag
British Army equipment
History of the British Army
Cold War military equipment of the United Kingdom
Military simulation